Hanover County Courthouse Historic District is a national historic district located at Hanover Courthouse, Hanover County, Virginia, USA. The district includes four contributing buildings in the county seat of Hanover Courthouse.  They are the separately listed Hanover County Courthouse (1735), the old jail (1835), the clerk's office (c. 1835), and the Hanover Tavern now known as the Barksdale Theatre.

It was listed on the National Register of Historic Places in 1971.

References

External links

Hanover County Courthouse, U.S. Route 301, Hanover, Hanover County, VA: 3 photos at Historic American Buildings Survey
Tavern at Hanover Courthouse, State Route 1002, Hanover, Hanover County, VA: 1 photo at Historic American Buildings Survey

Historic districts in Hanover County, Virginia
National Register of Historic Places in Hanover County, Virginia
Historic districts on the National Register of Historic Places in Virginia
Courthouses on the National Register of Historic Places in Virginia